National Environment Management Authority may refer to one of the following:

 National Environment Management Authority of Kenya
 National Environment Management Authority of Uganda